László Felkai (1 March 1941 – 10 April 2014) was a Hungarian water polo player and breaststroke swimmer who competed in the 1960 Summer Olympics, in the 1964 Summer Olympics, and in the 1968 Summer Olympics.

He was born in Budapest.

Felkai was part of the Hungarian water polo team which won the bronze medal in the 1960 tournament. He played three matches and scored four goals. He also participated in the 200 metre breaststroke competition but was eliminated in the first round.

Four years later he was a member of the Hungarian team which won the gold medal in the 1964 Olympic tournament. He played all six matches and scored six goals.

At the 1968 Games he won his second bronze medal with the Hungarian team. He played all eight matches and scored 24 goals.

Honours

National team 
Olympic Games: 3 time present at the Olympic Games
  1964 Tokyo
  1960 Rome, 1968 Mexico City

European Championship:
  1962 Leipzig

Universiade:
  1963 Porto Alegre, 1965 Budapest;  1959 Turin;  1961 Sofia

120 present in the national team of

Club 
 Bp. Kinizsi / Ferencváros - As player of FTC ( –1970)
 OB I (4x): 1962, 1963, 1965, 1968
 Magyar Kupa (5x): 1962, 1964, 1965, 1967, 1969

 Bp. Spartacus - As player of Spartacus (1970–1977)

Individual
 Hungarian Water Polo Player of the Year: 1964, 1968

See also
 Hungary men's Olympic water polo team records and statistics
 List of Olympic champions in men's water polo
 List of Olympic medalists in water polo (men)
 List of men's Olympic water polo tournament top goalscorers

References

External links
 

1941 births
2014 deaths
Hungarian male water polo players
Hungarian male swimmers
Male breaststroke swimmers
Olympic water polo players of Hungary
Olympic swimmers of Hungary
Water polo players at the 1960 Summer Olympics
Water polo players at the 1964 Summer Olympics
Water polo players at the 1968 Summer Olympics
Swimmers at the 1960 Summer Olympics
Olympic gold medalists for Hungary
Olympic bronze medalists for Hungary
Olympic medalists in water polo
Medalists at the 1968 Summer Olympics
Medalists at the 1964 Summer Olympics
Medalists at the 1960 Summer Olympics
Universiade medalists in water polo
Universiade gold medalists for Hungary
Universiade silver medalists for Hungary
Universiade bronze medalists for Hungary
Water polo players from Budapest